Albania participated in the Junior Eurovision Song Contest 2019 with the song "Mikja ime fëmijëri" written by Saimir Çili and Jorgo Papingji. The song was performed by Isea Çili. The Albanian entry for the 2019 contest in Gliwice, Poland was selected through a national final organised by the Albanian broadcaster Radio Televizioni Shqiptar (RTSH). The national final consisted of eighteen competing acts participating in a televised production where the winner was determined by 100% votes of jury members made up of music professionals. Isea Çili won the Junior Fest 2019 with the song "Mikja ime fëmijëri", on 29 September 2019.

Background

Prior to the 2019 Contest, Albania had participated in the Junior Eurovision Song Contest five times since its first entry in 2012, only opting not to participate at the 2013 and 2014 contests. Albania has never won the contest, with their best result being in 2015, with the song "Dambaje" performed by Mishela Rapo, achieving fifth place with a score of 93 points. In 2018, Efi Gjika represented Albania in Minsk, Belarus with the song "Barbie". The country ended in 17th place out of 20 countries, achieving 44 points.

Before Junior Eurovision

National final
The national final, Junior Fest 2019, took place on 29 September 2019. The national final consisted of eighteen competing acts participating in a televised production at the Amphitheater of the Lake Park in Tirana where the winner was be determined by 100% votes of jury members made up of music professionals. Isea Çili (born 13 September 2007) was the winner of the national final with the song "Mikja ime fëmijëria".

At Junior Eurovision
During the opening ceremony and the running order draw which both took place on 18 November 2019, Albania was drawn to perform eighteenth on 24 November 2019, following Italy and preceding Serbia.

Voting

Detailed voting results

References

Albania
2019
Junior Eurovision Song Contest